Winter Special Gift is the special winter album and second extended play by Chinese singer Lay (Zhang Yixing). It was released on December 22, 2017 in China by Tencent on the label's music apps, QQ Music, Kugou and Kuwo. The EP features six tracks in total, including single "Goodbye Christmas".

Background and release 
On December 21, it was announced that Lay would release his second EP. Winter Special Gift was officially released on December 22, 2017 through music apps under label Tencent. The album was subsequently released in South Korea the next day on December 23, 2017.

Gift to XBACK was written in 2015, prior to his debut as a solo artist. On December 15, Lay posted a video of himself performing the aforementioned song on Weibo in advance to the release of his album.

Singles 
The music video of the lead song for the album, Goodbye Christmas was released together with the album on the same day.

Commercial performance 
Within 1 hour of digital sales, the album broke four records on QQ Music: Gold, Double Gold, Triple Gold and Platinum. The album later broke Diamond record on QQ Music.

Track listing

Charts

Weekly charts

Sales

Release history

References

External links 
 "Goodbye Christmas" music video on YouTube

2017 albums
SM Entertainment albums
Lay Zhang albums
2017 in Chinese music
Chinese music industry
Chinese music-related lists